John Arthur Duttine (born 15 March 1949) is an English actor noted for his roles on stage, films and television. He is well known for his role as Sgt George Miller in Heartbeat and also Bill Masen in the TV series The Day of the Triffids.

Early life
Duttine was born on 15 March 1949 in Barnsley, West Riding of Yorkshire.

He attended Buttershaw Secondary School; Stephen Petcher from his school would also appear in Heartbeat. He grew up in Buttershaw, in south-west Bradford. He trained at the Drama Centre London in north London. In London he shared a flat with Bradford actor Ken Kitson.

Career
In 1973, Duttine starred opposite Francesca Annis in the BBC adaptation of A Pin to See the Peep Show by F. Tennyson Jesse.  This was followed in 1974 by a small role in the TV adaptation of the Lord Peter Wimsey story The Nine Tailors. His first big break came when he played John the Apostle in the 1977 television mini-series Jesus of Nazareth. This was followed almost immediately by his portrayal of Keith Nicholson, husband of football pools winner, Vivian Nicholson in John Goldschmidt's Spend, Spend, Spend (a Play for Today). He went on to star in the 1978 historical drama series The Devil's Crown, as the future King John.

Duttine then played leading roles in major BBC adaptations such as Wuthering Heights (as Earnshaw) in 1978. He became a household name for his lead performance in To Serve Them All My Days in 1980, for which he won the TV Times Best Actor award. He appeared to great acclaim in The Day of the Triffids (1981). In 1983 he starred in The Outsider as well as in the Tales of the Unexpected episode Hit And Run in which he played Doctor Roger Ashburn, a doctor who co-conceives an elaborate insurance fraud involving the staged disappearance and death of his wife (Susan Penhaligon), the sitcom Lame Ducks in 1984, and Ain't Misbehavin' from 1994 to 1995 as well as DI Eric Temple in all twelve episodes of Out of the Blue. He played opposite Sir Laurence Olivier in the play Saturday, Sunday, Monday, part of the Laurence Olivier Presents anthology series.

His film roles include Who Dares Wins (1982) and The Hawk (1993). More recent TV credits include: Doc Martin, Touching Evil, Taggart, Dangerfield, Midsomer Murders, Peak Practice, The Bill, Casualty, EastEnders, Dalziel and Pascoe and Jane Hall.

Duttine has played two characters in the UK television series Heartbeat. His first appearance was as Paul Methorn, an MP and peace activist, in episode 7 of the first series: Face Value. He then played the role of Sgt. George Miller, the character making his first appearance in episode 16 of series 14: Golf Papa One Zero.

In 2007, he guest starred in the Doctor Who audio drama Exotron & Urban Myths. In 2011 he guest-starred in Vera, playing a lieutenant colonel. More recently (November 2013) Duttine appeared in BBC TV's The Paradise.

In 2015, he appeared as Douglas Taylor in Series 3 of the BBC series WPC 56.

In 2016, he appeared as George Hammond in the BBC series Father Brown episode 4.3 "The Hangman's Demise". In 2016, he also appeared in the ITV/Netflix series Paranoid.

Personal life
Duttine has a son from a former partner (now deceased) in Tarleton, West Lancashire. In 1998 he married actress Mel Martin, with whom he lived in Cornwall until 2011. The two have appeared on screen together in Talking to Strange Men, Casualty and EastEnders. Though Mel Martin appeared in Heartbeat when John Duttine played Sergeant Miller, they never appeared in scenes together. His nephew is fellow actor Joe Duttine, who currently plays Tim Metcalfe in ITV soap opera Coronation Street''. Joe's father, Geoffrey, is John's brother.

Filmography

References

External links
 

1949 births
Male actors from Yorkshire
Alumni of the Drama Centre London
English male film actors
English male television actors
Living people
Actors from Barnsley
People from Hebden Bridge